The Glenorchy Art and Sculpture Park (GASP) is a sculpture park in Glenorchy, Tasmania, Australia. Commencing at Montrose Foreshore Community Park, GASP follows Elwick Bay's foreshore, terminating at Wilkinsons Point. GASP is in close proximity to the MyState Bank Arena, Elwick Racecourse and the Museum of Old and New Art (MONA) in Berriedale.

History
In 2005 a small group of civic and business leaders, led by Adriana Taylor and Madeleine Ogilvie and the Glenorchy City Council sought to improve foreshore access and create greater linkage between the town centre and Wilkinson's Point through the creation of a new sculpture park. Access to major recreational and entertainment venues on the point including the Derwent Entertainment Centre and Elwick Racecourse was previously limited to road infrastructure stemming from the Brooker Highway. A design competition was held, with architects Room 11 winning the tender and funding supplied by the Federal Government, Tasmanian Government and Glenorchy City Council. Consisting of a parkland containing several pathways, bridges and buildings forming an arc around Elwick Bay, GASP was opened in 2011 by Prime Minister Julia Gillard with pupils from Rosetta Primary School.

Completed in 2014, Stage 2 included a coloured-glass sheltered pavilion and courtyard at Wilkinson's Point. Stage 2 was built on grounds historically utilised as a building deck for the Bowen Bridge and new sections of the Tasman Bridge following the Tasman Bridge disaster, when the bulk ore transport MV Lake Illawarra struck the bridge in 1975. Multiple coloured-glass panels were shattered by vandals at the pavilion in 2016, instigating CCTV cameras to be installed. The damage incurred costs amounting to $75,000.

Funding
In 2021, the Glenorchy City Council dissolved the Directors of the Glenorchy Art & Sculpture Park, saying it was no longer in a financial position to support the parkland development, citing annual costs of $100,000 and the ongoing effects of COVID-19 as major contributors to their decision. The sculpture park remains open to the public, however in 2022 funding has not been secured for future development.

Awards
Australian Institute of Landscape Architects
 AILA National Award for Civic Landscape (2016)
 VIC Award for Excellence in Design (2015)

Australian Institute of Architects
 Dirk Bolt Award for Urban Design (2014)

Cement Concrete & Aggregates Australia
 CCAA Public Domain Award (2013)

Access
GASP can be accessed from the Montrose Foreshore Community Park on the eastern end and Loyds Road along Wilkinson's Point. It is a 40 minute Metro Tasmania bus ride from the Hobart City Centre.

See also
List of sculpture parks

References

2008 establishments in Australia
Geography of Hobart
Glenorchy, Tasmania
Landmarks in Hobart
Sculpture gardens, trails and parks in Australia
Tourist attractions in Hobart